Taken, also known as Steven Spielberg Presents Taken, is an American science fiction miniseries that first aired on the Sci-Fi Channel from December 2 to 13, 2002. Filmed in Vancouver, British Columbia, Canada, it was written by Leslie Bohem, and directed by Breck Eisner, Félix Enríquez Alcalá, John Fawcett, Tobe Hooper, Jeremy Paul Kagan, Michael Katleman, Sergio Mimica-Gezzan, Bryan Spicer, Jeff Woolnough, and Thomas J. Wright. The executive producers were Leslie Bohem and Steven Spielberg.

The show takes place from 1944 to 2002 and follows the lives of three families: the Crawfords, who seek to cover up the Roswell crash and the existence of aliens; the Keyses, who are subject to frequent experimentation by the aliens; and the Clarkes, who sheltered one of the surviving aliens from the crash. As a result of the decades-long storyline, not a single actor or character appears in every episode of the series, though the voice of Dakota Fanning (who narrates as well as stars as Allie Keys) is in every episode. Reception was positive. The series won the Emmy Award for Outstanding Miniseries and was nominated for the Golden Globe Award for Outstanding Miniseries or TV Movie.

When the show was launched, the Sci-Fi Channel used the simultaneous establishment of the organization Coalition for Freedom of Information in its promotion campaign. Both the Sci-Fi Channel and the Coalition for Freedom of Information are clients of Washington, D.C. public relations firm PodestaMattoon, and this apparent co-mingling of clients was criticized. The Coalition for Freedom of Information is a group which seeks the release of classified governmental UFO files as well as scientific, Congressional, and media credibility for the study of this subject.

Actors starring in the series include Joel Gretsch, Steve Burton, Eric Close, Heather Donahue, Matt Frewer, Catherine Dent, Ryan Hurst, Adam Kaufman, Karen Austin, Julie Benz, Tina Holmes, Willie Garson, John Hawkes, Jason Gray-Stanford, Andy Powers, Ryan Merriman, Michael Moriarty, Michael Jeter, James McDaniel, James Kirk, and Dakota Fanning.

Characters

Synopsis
Taken spans five decades and four generations, and centers on three families: the Keyses, the Crawfords, and the Clarkes. Nightmares of abduction by extraterrestrials during World War II haunt Russell Keys; the Roswell UFO incident transforms Owen Crawford from ambitious Air Force captain to amoral shadow government conspirator; and an alien visitor impregnates an unhappily married Sally Clarke. As the decades go by, the heirs of each are affected by the machinations of the aliens, culminating with the birth of Allie Keys, the final product of the aliens' experimentation and the key to their future.

The Artifact
The "Artifact" is a mysterious device connected to the aliens. The Artifact was initially on one of the alien ships flying over Earth on July 2, 1947, but the ship collided with a spy balloon and crashed, and most of its crew died. The Artifact itself was thrown clear of the ship and left half-buried in the ground. It was found and retrieved by Sue, a local woman who was the estranged girlfriend of ambitious Air Force Captain Owen Crawford.

Sue, seeing the small scrap of metal had alien writing on it and hoping it would rekindle her relationship with Owen, takes it to him. Owen, who is being phased out of the investigation into the crashed alien spaceship (which itself was retrieved), brutally murders Sue. Owen then shows the Artifact to his superior, Colonel Thomas Campbell, and blackmails him into promoting him to Major and making him head of the Roswell UFO Investigation Project.

Over the next 50 years, the Artifact remains in the possession of the Crawford family, and acts as the guide to each member's efforts to understand the aliens' mission on Earth.

The Artifact's true nature isn't revealed until 2002, when the head of the Project, Mary Crawford, discovers new writing is still being formed on the Artifact's surface. This reveals to the government that the Artifact is the recording device of the aliens' great genetic experiment: to create a hybrid being possessing the aliens' powers and more-evolved consciousness as well as humankind's emotional core, which will lead them to the next step in their evolution. It has been continuously recording the events of the aliens' experiments over the decades since its arrival on Earth.

When the hybrid Allie Keys departs with the aliens, the Artifact is teleported away with them.

Implants
As part of their experiment, the aliens abducted thousands of innocent humans (exactly 46,367), mostly at night or while on airplanes, in order to find suitable breeding pairs and humans compatible with their DNA, to begin the process of creating the ultimate hybrid of human and alien. The aliens placed implants in an area of the brain that made it impossible to remove without killing or inflicting critical brain damage on the person (at least by the standards of human science). The implants also had a hand in manipulating a person's memories following their abduction, and served as tracking devices, to allow the aliens to abduct their human test subjects wherever they may be.

The implants remained undiscovered until 1962, when Russell Keys' head was x-rayed to determine the cause of his seizures. The doctors treating him initially believed it was a tumor, but his son Jesse, suspecting it might be related to the aliens, demanded he have the same x-ray, and a similar implant was discovered.

Hoping to find a way to neutralize the implants and be free of the aliens' interference, Russell and Jesse arranged a meeting with Colonel Owen Crawford. Russell, in private, offered up his implant in order to save his son from grave harm, despite knowing it would most likely lead to his death to have it removed. Owen accepted, and Russell was escorted to a secret surgery facility. Upon his arrival, Russell realized Owen had betrayed him, but he was overpowered by the guards and sedated. The project's doctor successfully removed the implant from Russell's brain. Seconds later, it was revealed that the implant exerts some form of negative psychic effect on human minds. The scientists and guards were driven insane. One guard fires his machine gun at nearby oxygen tanks, causing the entire trailer to explode, killing Russell, Kreutz, and all within.

Learning from their mistakes, the UFO Project took precautions while retrieving and analyzing more implants from other test subjects or from their corpses. Eventually, a sophisticated tracking system was created by Doctor Chet Wakeman, which was used with great effect in tracking down abductees.  Essentially, the implants give off a tracking signal based on the frequency of the basic element hydrogen, which once discovered made it relatively easy for the government's UFO project to track the abductees as well.

The aliens kept using the implants as part of the experiment, ultimately using them to bring the Clarke and Keys families together to produce Allie Keys.

After John taught Allie how to remove the implants, she used the ability on everyone that came to protect her at the farmhouse so they wouldn't be taken anymore, and would no longer be afraid.

Aliens
The Roswell Gray aliens depicted in the series are about as large as a child, but possess incredible psychic powers. According to Dr. Wakeman, they do not even originate from our dimension or plane of reality, though while here they are subject to our physical laws (accidentally hitting a weather balloon during a storm was enough to make the Roswell saucer crash). Their "technology" is so far advanced that it is essentially an extension of their minds, capable of being reformed at will. The aliens can also create utterly realistic hallucinations in humans, and often use this to try to interact with abductees.  Sometimes they get a bit confused however, and re-use mental projections for one family member on another.

The reason the aliens are abducting humans is part of their hybridization experiment. When the aliens initially crashed in Roswell, it was just a scouting mission. However one surviving alien, "John", evaded capture by the army and (after assuming a projection of human form) was given shelter by Sally Clarke until he was retrieved by another ship. As Dr. Wakeman eventually pieces together, and the alien "John" confirms, Sally's simple act of kindness awoke an echo of something long dormant in the aliens. They had evolved to be millions of years in development ahead of humans, but the evolutionary tree is a branching path, so in the process they had evolved away from some of their more "primitive" aspects, such as emotions. John's encounter with Sally made the aliens realize they had evolved away from emotion and morality, and even with this knowledge they could not simply re-attain it. Therefore, the aliens decided to hybridize themselves with humans to try to recover these qualities that they had lost. While their abductions were considered frightening and invasive by humans, John explains that the entire problem was that the aliens simply had no concept of "good" or "evil", and were incapable of making such a value judgment.

Unfortunately, long-term contact with the aliens and their extra-dimensional technology leads to various health problems in most humans. For reasons even the aliens aren't quite sure of, the Keys family is genetically able to be unaffected by these problems. Sally Clarke did not possess these genetic traits, and thus her hybrid child fathered by John was unable to fully harness his alien powers. All of this culminated in Allie Keys, the daughter of Charlie Keys and Lisa Clarke, who was capable of fully using her alien abilities.

Production
The series had a reported budget of $40 million.

Episodes

References

External links

 
 

2000s American science fiction television series
2002 American television series debuts
2002 American television series endings
2000s American television miniseries
Syfy original programming
Roswell incident in fiction
Television series by DreamWorks Television
Alien abduction in television
Primetime Emmy Award for Outstanding Miniseries winners
Primetime Emmy Award-winning television series
Saturn Award-winning television series
Television series set in 1944
Television series set in 1947
Television series set in 1953
Television series set in 1958
Television series set in 1959
Television series set in 1962
Television series set in 1970
Television series set in 1980
Television series set in 1981
Television series set in 1986
Television series set in 1992
Television series set in 1993
Television series set in 1996
Television series set in 2002
Works about the Cuban Missile Crisis
Television shows set in Alaska
Television shows set in California
Television shows set in Chicago
Television shows set in Dallas
Television shows set in Maine
Television shows set in Michigan
Television shows set in Milwaukee
Television shows set in Minnesota
Television shows set in Montana
Television shows set in Nevada
Television shows set in New Mexico
Television shows set in North Dakota
Television shows set in Ohio
Television shows set in Seattle
Television shows set in Washington, D.C.
UFO-related television
Television shows filmed in Vancouver